The 1892 United States House of Representatives elections in Florida were held on November 8, 1892, for two seats in the 53rd Congress.  These elections were held at the same time as the 1892 presidential election and election for governor.

Background
Florida's congressional delegation had been dominated by Democrats since 1884, with the Republicans losing every Congressional election since then. In 1890, a new party, the People's Party, also known as the Populists, had been established, winning nine seats in the House.

Election results
The Republicans did not run any candidates for Congress in 1892.  The new People's Party made its first appearance in Florida's congressional elections this year. Democrat Robert Bullock of the  did not run for renomination.

See also
United States House of Representatives elections, 1892

References

1892
Florida
United States House of Representatives